The 1972 Texas 500 was a NASCAR Winston Cup Series racing event that took place on November 12, 1972, at Texas World Speedway in College Station, Texas.

Race report
The race was 250 laps on a paved track spanning  in front of 33,000 live spectators. It took exactly 3 hours and 24 seconds for Buddy Baker to defeat A. J. Foyt by ½ of a car length. Baker's victory played a role in making 1972 the first NASCAR Cup Series season without any first-time Cup series winners. Foyt had earned the pole position with a speed of  during the qualifying runs even though the actual race speeds approached . Five cautions slowed the race for 29 laps. All the 44 drivers on the racing grid were American-born males.

Bill Seifert of the famous Giachetti Brothers (headed by Richard Giachetti) finished the race in the last-place position due to a clutch problem in the first lap of the race. Bill Champion had engine issues on lap 16 while Earle Canavan had windshield issues on lap 30. Ron Keselowski would ruin his vehicle's engine on lap 38 while Bill Hollar did the same thing on lap 68. Frank Warren would ruin his vehicle's engine on lap 92. Jabe Thomas noticed that his vehicle's suspension acted strangely on lap 93.

H.B. Bailey would lose the rear end of his vehicle on lap 106. Gordon Johncock's engine expired on lap 182. Once Buddy Arrington dropped out with engine failure after completing 184 laps, Petty had locked up a 33rd-place finish. Petty only needed to complete 190 laps to clinch the championship; becoming the champion on lap 191. Clarence Lovell's engine stopped working on lap 196 while Paul Feldner's engine stopped working on lap 198. Larry Smith had identical problems to Lovell and Feldner on lap 199. Johnny Rutherford had to stop racing due to a problematic engine on lap 224.

Seven notable crew chiefs were recorded as participating in the event; including Dale Inman and Harry Hyde. Paul Feldner and Bill Shirey would make their final NASCAR Winston Cup Series starts, while Rick Newsom would make his debut.

Only manual transmission vehicles were allowed to participate in this race; a policy that NASCAR has retained to the present day. Unfortunately, this race broke Bobby Allison's streak of leading a lap from the 1971 Southern 500 all the way to the 1972 American 500. This streak would be known as the "Joe DiMaggio Streak" after the famous baseball player, and it has not been accomplished by any driver after this date.

Individual prize winnings for each driver ranged from the winner's share of $14,920 ($ when considering inflation) to the last-place finishers' share of just $705 ($ when considering inflation). The total prize purse for this racing event was locked in at $88,270 ($ when considering inflation).

Qualifying

Finishing order
Section reference:

 Buddy Baker
 A.J. Foyt
 Richard Petty
 Bobby Allison
 Hershel McGriff
 Benny Parsons
 Coo Coo Marlin
 Cecil Gordon
 Cale Yarborough
 Joe Frasson
 James Hylton
 Dave Marcis
 Ramo Stott
 J.D. McDuffie
 Ben Arnold
 John Sears
 Dick Brooks
 Walter Ballard
 Jim Whitt
 Dean Dalton
 Raymond Williams
 Rick Newsom
 Harry Schilling
 Elmo Langley
 Ed Negre
 Johnny Rutherford
 David Sisco
 Charlie Roberts
 Bill Shirey
 Mel Larson
 Larry Smith
 Paul Feldner
 Clarence Lovell
 Buddy Arrington
 Gordon Johncock
 H.B. Bailey
 Jabe Thomas
 Frank Warren
 Henley Gray
 Bill Hollar
 Ron Keselowski
 Earle Canavan
 Bill Champion
 Bill Seifert

References

Texas 500
Texas
NASCAR races at Texas World Speedway